Dirt is the second studio album by the American rock band Alice in Chains, released on September 29, 1992, through Columbia Records. Peaking at No. 6 on the Billboard 200 chart, the album received critical acclaim and is considered a classic in the grunge genre. It has since been certified 5x Platinum by the RIAA, making Dirt the band's highest selling album to date.  It was the band's last album recorded with all four original members, as bassist Mike Starr was fired in January 1993 during the tour to support the album. The album spawned five singles: "Would?", "Them Bones", "Angry Chair", "Rooster", and "Down in a Hole", all with accompanying music videos. Dirt was nominated for a Grammy Award for Best Hard Rock Performance. The music video for "Would?" was nominated for an MTV Video Music Award for Best Video from a Film, as the song was featured on the soundtrack to Cameron Crowe's 1992 film Singles.

The songs on the album focused on depression, pain, anger, anti-social behavior, relationships, drug addiction (primarily heroin), war, death, and other emotionally charged topics. The track "Iron Gland" features Tom Araya from Slayer on vocals. Most of the music from the album was written by guitarist Jerry Cantrell, but for the first time vocalist Layne Staley wrote two songs by himself ("Hate to Feel" and "Angry Chair"), both also featuring Staley on guitar. 

Retrospectively, the album has continued to receive acclaim, with Rolling Stone placing the album at No. 26 on its list of the 100 Greatest Metal Albums of All Time. Dirt was included in the 2005 book 1001 Albums You Must Hear Before You Die. It was voted "Kerrang! Critic's Choice Album of the Year". Guitar World named Dirt as the best guitar album of 1992. Loudwire named it as one of the best Metal albums of the 1990s, and Rolling Stone ranked it at No. 6 on its list of "50 Greatest Grunge Albums" in 2019.

Alice in Chains' fourth studio album, Black Gives Way to Blue, was released on the 17th anniversary of Dirt, on September 29, 2009.

Background and recording
The recording of Dirt began in the spring of 1992. Producer Dave Jerden, who had previously worked with the band on their debut, Facelift, wanted to work with them again. He admired vocalist Layne Staley's lyrics and voice, and lead guitarist Jerry Cantrell's guitar riffs. The track "Would?" produced, engineered and mixed by Rick Parashar, was recorded before the album, and first appeared on the soundtrack to the 1992 movie Singles. Dirt was recorded at Eldorado Recording Studio in Burbank, California, London Bridge Studio in Seattle, and One on One Studios in Los Angeles from April to July 1992.

Dirt was recorded during the Los Angeles riots that erupted following the acquittal of four LAPD officers caught on camera beating unarmed black motorist Rodney King. The riots started on the first day of recording. The band was watching TV when the verdict for the incident was announced. Jerry Cantrell was in a store buying some beer when a man came in and started looting the place. Cantrell also got stuck in traffic and saw people pulling each other out of their cars and beating them. The band tried to get out of the town without getting hurt while LA was protesting against police brutality. They took Slayer vocalist Tom Araya with them and went to the Joshua Tree desert for four or five days until things calmed down, then moved back into the studio and started recording the album.

When recording the album, Staley had previously checked out of rehab and quickly went back to using heroin. Staley later went cold-turkey on his own while reading The Bad Place, by horror novelist Dean R. Koontz. Jerden later said that he was told Staley felt animosity toward him dating back to the Dirt sessions due to Jerden repeatedly recommending to Staley that he get sober at the time. Jerden said, "Apparently he got all mad at me [during the Dirt sessions] ... And what's my job as a producer? To produce a record. I'm not getting paid to be Layne's friend."

Staley was not the only one who went through heavy drug use; drummer Sean Kinney and bassist Mike Starr were also struggling with alcohol addiction.

Dave Jerden got the album's famous guitar tone by blending three different amps - a Bogner Fish preamp for the low end, a Bogner Ecstacy for the mid frequencies, and a Rockman Headphone amp for the high frequencies.

Music and lyrics

With songs written primarily on the road, the material is darker than Facelift. "We did a lot of soul searching on this album. There's a lot of intense feelings." Cantrell said, "We deal with our daily demons through music. All of the poison that builds up during the day we cleanse when we play". Drug use was front and center as a lyrical theme on the album. Three tracks ("Sickman", "Junkhead" and "God Smack") specifically reference heroin use and its effects.

Staley revealed that the album is semi-conceptual and that there are two basic themes in it. The first theme is about "dealing with kind of a personal anguish and turmoil, which turns into drugs to ease that pain, and being confident that that was the answer in a way. Then later on the songs start to slip down closer and closer to hell, and then he figures out that drugs were not, and are not, the way to ease that pain. Basically, it's the whole story of the last three years of my life." Staley described the other theme as being about "painful relationships and involvements with persons."

Staley later expressed regret about the lyrical content of some songs on Dirt, explaining, "I wrote about drugs, and I didn't think I was being unsafe or careless by writing about them ... I didn't want my fans to think that heroin was cool. But then I've had fans come up to me and give me the thumbs up, telling me they're high. That's exactly what I didn't want to happen."

Cantrell said in 2013: "That darkness was always part of the band, but it wasn’t all about that. There was always an optimism, even in the darkest shit we wrote. With Dirt, it’s not like we were saying ‘Oh yeah, this is a good thing.’ It was more of a warning than anything else, rather than ‘Hey, come and check this out, it’s great!’ We were talking about what was going on at the time, but within that there was always a survivor element – a kind of triumph over the darker elements of being a human being. I still think we have all of that intact, but maybe the percentage has shifted."

Cantrell told RIP magazine in 1993 that not all of the lyrics have drug references:

In the liner notes of 1999's Music Bank box set collection, Cantrell cited "Junkhead" and "God Smack" as "the most openly honest" songs about drug use.

Cantrell said he wrote "Them Bones" about "mortality, that one of these days we'll end up a pile of bones." He told RIP magazine in 1993: "'Them Bones' is pretty cut and dried. It's a little sarcastic, but it's pretty much about dealing with your mortality and life. Everybody's going to die someday. Instead of being afraid of it, that's the way it is: so enjoy the time you've got. Live as much as you can, have as much fun as possible. Face your fear and live. I had family members die at a fairly early age; so I've always had kind of a phobia about it. Death freaks me out. I think it freaks a lot of people out. It's the end of life, depending on your views. It's a pretty scary thing. "Them Bones" is trying to put that thought to rest. Use what you have left, and use it well."

Cantrell was inspired to write "Dam That River" after a fight he had with Sean Kinney, in which Kinney broke a coffee table over his head. The lyrics to "Rain When I Die" were written by Cantrell and Staley about their respective girlfriends. "Sickman" came together after Staley asked Cantrell to "write him the sickest tune, the sickest, darkest, most fucked up and heaviest thing [Cantrell] could write."

"Rooster" was written by Cantrell for his father, Jerry Cantrell Sr., who served in the Vietnam War and his childhood nickname was "Rooster". Cantrell described the song as "the start of the healing process between my Dad and I from all that damage that Vietnam caused."

Discussing the title track "Dirt", Cantrell stated that "the words Layne put to it were so heavy, I've never given him something and not thought it was gonna be the most bad-assed thing I was going to hear." Staley said he wrote the song "to a certain person who basically buried my ass".

The 43-second "Iron Gland" was developed out of a guitar riff that Cantrell would play that annoyed the other band members, so he created the song (adding in a reference to Black Sabbath's "Iron Man") and promised to never play the guitar riff again, although the track is played as intro music in concert. It features Tom Araya of thrash metal band Slayer on vocals, as well as Layne Staley. "Hate to Feel" and "Angry Chair" were both composed solely by Staley, who also played guitar on both tracks, and Cantrell has expressed his pride in seeing Staley grow as a songwriter and guitarist.

"Down in a Hole" was written by Cantrell to his long-time girlfriend, Courtney Clarke. Cantrell explained the song in the liner notes of 1999's Music Bank box set: "["Down in a Hole"]'s in my top three, personally. It's to my long-time love. It's the reality of my life, the path I've chosen and in a weird way it kind of foretold where we are right now. It's hard for us to both understand...that this life is not conducive to much success with long-term relationships."

The album's final track, "Would?", was written by Cantrell as a tribute to his friend and late lead singer of Mother Love Bone, Andrew Wood, who died of a drug overdose in 1990. Cantrell said the song is also "directed towards people who pass judgments."

Packaging and title
The album's cover art features a woman half buried in a cracked desert landscape. The cover was photographed by Rocky Schenck, who also created the image along with the album's art director, Mary Maurer. It was the band's idea to have a nude woman half-buried in the desert for this cover, and she could be either dead or alive. The band discussed the type of woman they wanted and Schenck began casting shortly after. Schenck submitted a photo of model/actress Mariah O'Brien and the band chose her.

The cover shoot took place at Schenck's Hollywood studio on June 14, 1992, with the supervision of drummer Sean Kinney. After the eight hour photo session, O'Brien went to the bathroom and left her wig embedded in the dirt. Schenck then snapped a few photos, which were later used for the 1999 box set Music Bank.

For many years, fans believed that the model on the cover was Staley's then-girlfriend, Demri Parrott, but Schenck revealed to Revolver Magazine in 2011 that the girl was actually Mariah O'Brien, with whom he had previously worked on the cover of Spinal Tap's single "Bitch School". The magazine also published behind the scenes photos from the shoot featuring O'Brien. Schenck told Revolver Magazine:

In an interview with the Canadian magazine M.E.A.T. in December 1992, Layne Staley said about the cover:

The cover was referenced on the music video for Alice in Chains' 2009 single "A Looking in View". At the 6:55 mark of the video, a woman (played by Sacha Senisch) is seen lying on a cracked desert floor similarly to Dirt'''s cover. "A Looking in View" was featured on Alice in Chains' fourth studio album, Black Gives Way to Blue, released exactly 17 years after Dirt, on September 29, 2009.

Release and commercial performance
Upon its release in September 1992, Dirt peaked at number six on the Billboard 200 and charted for 102 weeks, ending at number 196 in the week of September 24, 1994. Dirt granted Alice in Chains international recognition, and the album was certified five times platinum status in the United States, platinum status in Canada and gold status in the UK. The album had sold 3,358,000 copies in the United States as of 2008. A remastered reissue of the album was released on vinyl on November 23, 2009.

The album returned to the top 10 of the Billboard 200 chart at No. 9 following the release of its 30th anniversary reissue on September 23, 2022.

Reception and legacyDirt received critical acclaim, and is considered by many critics and fans alike as the group's best album. In a retrospective review, Steve Huey of AllMusic said "Dirt is Alice in Chains' major artistic statement and the closest they ever came to recording a flat-out masterpiece. It's a primal, sickening howl from the depths of Layne Staley's heroin addiction, and one of the most harrowing concept albums ever recorded. Not every song on Dirt is explicitly about heroin, but Jerry Cantrell's solo-written contributions (nearly half the album) effectively maintain the thematic coherence—nearly every song is imbued with the morbidity, self-disgust, and/or resignation of a self-aware yet powerless addict."

Michael Christopher of PopMatters praised the album saying "the record wasn't celebratory by any means – but you'll be hard pressed to find a more brutally truthful work laid down – and that's why it will always be one of the greatest records ever made." Chris Gill of Guitar World called Dirt "huge and foreboding, yet eerie and intimate," and "sublimely dark and brutally honest." Don Kaye of Kerrang! described Dirt as "brutally truthful and a fiercely rocking testimonial to human endurance".Dirt is often considered as one of the most influential albums to the sludge metal subgenre, which fuses doom metal with hardcore punk. It was voted "Kerrang! Critic's Choice Album of the Year" for 1992.Dirt included the top-30 singles "Would?", "Them Bones", "Angry Chair", "Rooster", and "Down in a Hole", all of which had accompanying music videos. The album remained on Billboard's charts for nearly two years.

At the 1993 Grammy Awards, Dirt received a nomination for Best Hard Rock Performance. The band also contributed the song "Would?" to the soundtrack for the 1992 Cameron Crowe film Singles, whose video received an award for Best Video from a Film at the 1993 MTV Video Music Awards.Dirt was also included in the 2005 book 1001 Albums You Must Hear Before You Die.

In 2008, Dirt was ranked as 5th best album in the last two decades by Close-Up magazine.

In 2011, Joe Robinson of Loudwire named Dirt as one of the best metal albums of the 1990s, alongside other albums such as Megadeth's Rust in Peace and Tool's Ænima, writing "In the battle between metal and grunge, Alice in Chains are a rare band that is embraced by fans of both genres. The most metal of the Seattle bands, they were marketed as metal for 1990's 'Facelift,' then touted as grunge for 1992's 'Dirt.' The band members themselves didn't bother much with labels, they just churned out some of the finest alt-metal with classics like 'Would?,' 'Rooster' and 'Them Bones' leading their charge all the way to the headlining spot on Lollapalooza '93."

In October 2011, the album was ranked number one on Guitar World magazine's top ten list of guitar albums of 1992, with The Offspring's Ignition in second place and Bad Religion's Generator in third place.

In June 2017, Dirt was ranked at No. 26 on Rolling Stones list of the "100 Greatest Metal Albums of All Time". In April 2019, Rolling Stone ranked the album at No. 6 on its list of the "50 Greatest Grunge Albums".

Tour

Alice in Chains was added as openers to Ozzy Osbourne's No More Tours tour. Days before the tour began, Staley broke his foot in an ATV accident, forcing him to use crutches on stage. During the tour, Starr was fired following the Hollywood Rock concert in Rio de Janeiro on January 22, 1993, and was replaced by former Ozzy Osbourne bassist Mike Inez.

During June–August 1993, Alice in Chains joined Primus, Tool, Rage Against the Machine and Babes in Toyland for the alternative music festival Lollapalooza, which was the last major tour the band played with Staley.

Track listing
"Sickman", "Junkhead", "Dirt" and "God Smack" are credited to Cantrell/Staley with no specification for lyrics or music. "Rain When I Die" is credited to Cantrell/Staley/Kinney/Starr, and it was later stated that Cantrell and Staley wrote the lyrics.

 I On early U.S. and Canadian pressings, "Down in a Hole" appeared as track 12 placed between "Angry Chair" and "Would?". Current U.S. and Canadian editions of the CD and the Vinyl have "Down in a Hole" as the fourth track, located between "Rain When I Die" and "Sickman", which was the track listing that the band originally intended before the record company changed the order.

 II Track 9 or 10, "Iron Gland", appears without a title on the album. The title appeared on the compilations Nothing Safe and Music Bank. The iTunes Store lists it incorrectly as "Iron Man". Before the name "Iron Gland" was revealed, it was labeled in some online databases as "Intro (Dream Sequence)". On editions in which "Down in a Hole" is track 4, "Iron Gland" is track 10. The track is unlisted on some versions of the album, and some editions remove the track completely or merge it with "Hate to Feel". On the back cover of the edition in which "Iron Gland" is track 9, "Hate to Feel", "Angry Chair", "Down in a Hole" and "Would?" are listed from 9–12. However, when the CD is played, the songs are on tracks 10–13.

Outtakes
The songs "Fear the Voices" and "Lying Season" were featured on Alice in Chains' 1991 demo tape that featured songs from Sap and Dirt. Both of these songs were later included on the band's 1999 box set, Music Bank. "Fear the Voices" was released as a single in 1999 to promote Music Bank and became a radio hit that same year. Regarding the two songs, Cantrell said that they came from a time when the band was still developing its sound.

PersonnelAlice in ChainsLayne Staley – lead vocals, rhythm guitar on "Hate to Feel" and "Angry Chair"
Jerry Cantrell – co-lead vocals on "Down in a Hole", "Angry Chair" and "Would?", backing vocals, lead guitar, acoustic guitar on "Down In a Hole"
Mike Starr – bass
Sean Kinney – drumsAdditional personnelTom Araya – vocals on "Iron Gland"Technical personnel'''
 Alice in Chains – production
 Dave Jerden – production (except on "Would?"), mixing
 Rick Parashar – production on "Would?"
 Bryan Carlstrom – engineering
 Annette Cisneros – engineering, mixing 
 Ulrich Wild – engineering
 Steve Hall and Eddy Schreyer – mastering
 Mary Maurer – art direction, visual effects
 Doug Erb – cover design
 David Coleman – logo
Layne Staley – sun logo/icons
 Rocky Schenck – photography

Charts

Weekly charts

Year-end charts

Certifications

References

External links

1992 albums
Alice in Chains albums
Albums produced by Dave Jerden
Columbia Records albums